The Ceylon Chronicle was a short-lived English-language newspaper in Ceylon. The newspaper started on 3 May 1837 with Rev. Samuel Owen Glenie as editor. Rev. Glenie was the Anglican Colonial Chaplain of St. Paul's Church and later Archdeacon of Colombo. Although owned privately by a group of civil servants, the newspaper took a pro-government stance and had the support of senior government officials. Governor Robert Wilmot-Horton, Treasurer Temple, Postmaster General George Lee, Acting Chief Justice Sergeant Rough, Auditor General Henry Marshall and Proctor Henry Staples all wrote for the newspaper. The Ceylon Chronicle was a counter-weight to The Observer and Commercial Advertiser which opposed the government.

Rev. Glenie stepped down as editor after his bishop objected and was succeeded by Postmaster General George Lee. The newspaper ceased publication on 3 September 1838. The Chronicle′s printing press was bought by Mackenzie Ross who started The Ceylon Herald four days later on 7 September 1838.

References

1837 establishments in Ceylon
1838 disestablishments in Ceylon
Defunct English-language newspapers published in Sri Lanka
Newspapers established in 1837
Publications disestablished in 1838